The following is an complete list of sports stadiums in Central Asia, East Asia, South Asia, Southeast Asia, and West Asia. They are ordered by their capacity. Currently only stadiums with a capacity of 30,000 or more are included.

Most large stadiums in the continent of Asia are used for football, cricket, athletics, or baseball, depending on the regions.
capacity, that is the maximum number of spectators the stadium can normally accommodate, therefore excluding temporary extra accommodations.

Current stadiums

Afghanistan below 30,000 capacity

Armenia below 30,000 capacity

Azerbaijan below 30,000 capacity

Azerbaijan below 30,000 capacity indoor stadiums

Bahrain below 30,000 capacity

Bangladesh below 30,000 capacity

Bhutan below 30,000 capacity

Brunei below 30,000 capacity

China below 30,000 capacity

China below 30,000 capacity indoor stadiums

Cyprus below 30,000 capacity

Georgia below 30,000 capacity

Georgia below 30,000 capacity indoor stadiums

Hong Kong below 30,000 capacity stadiums

Hong Kong below 30,000 capacity indoor stadiums

India below 30,000 capacity

India below 30,000 capacity indoor stadiums

Indonesia below 30,000 capacity

Iran below 30,000 capacity

Iraq below 30,000 capacity

Israel below 30,000 capacity

Israel below 30,000 capacity indoor stadiums

Japan below 30,000 capacity

Japan below 30,000 capacity indoor stadiums

Jordan below 30,000 capacity

Kazakhstan below 30,000 capacity

Kuwait below 30,000 capacity

Laos below 30,000 capacity

Macau below 30,000 capacity

Malaysia below 30,000 capacity

Malaysia below 30,000 capacity indoor stadiums

Maldives below 30,000 capacity

Mongolia below 30,000 capacity

Myanmar below 30,000 capacity

Nepal below 30,000 capacity

Northern Cyprus below 30,000 capacity

North Korea below 30,000 capacity

North Korea below 30,000 capacity indoor stadiums

Oman below 30,000 capacity

Pakistan below 30,000 capacity

Palestine below 30,000 capacity

Philippines below 30,000 capacity

Philippines below 30,000 capacity indoor stadiums

Qatar below 30,000 capacity

Qatar below 30,000 capacity indoor stadiums

Saudi Arabia below 30,000 capacity

South Korea below 30,000 capacity

South Korea below 30,000 capacity indoor stadiums

Sri Lanka below 30,000 capacity

Syria below 30,000 capacity

Taiwan below 30,000 capacity

Taiwan below 30,000 capacity indoor stadiums

Tajikistan below 30,000 capacity

Thailand below 30,000 capacity

Thailand below 30,000 capacity indoor stadiums

Turkey below 30,000 capacity

Turkey below 30,000 capacity indoor stadiums

Turkmenistan below 30,000 capacity

United Arab Emirates below 30,000 capacity

United Arab Emirates below 30,000 capacity indoor stadiums

Uzbekistan below 30,000 capacity

Uzbekistan below 30,000 capacity indoor stadiums

Vietnam below 30,000 capacity

Yemen below 30,000 capacity

See also

Lists of stadiums by continent

List of African stadiums by capacity
List of European stadiums by capacity
List of North American stadiums by capacity
List of Oceanian stadiums by capacity
List of South American stadiums by capacity

Lists of stadiums worldwide

 List of association football stadiums by capacity
 List of association football stadiums by country
 List of athletics stadiums
 List of baseball stadiums by capacity
 List of basketball arenas
 List of bullrings by capacity
 List of closed stadiums by capacity
 List of covered stadiums by capacity
 List of cricket grounds by capacity
 List of future stadiums
 List of indoor arenas
 List of indoor arenas by capacity
 List of rugby league stadiums by capacity
 List of rugby union stadiums by capacity
 List of sporting venues with a highest attendance of 100,000 or more
 List of sports venues by capacity
 List of stadiums by capacity
 List of tennis stadiums by capacity

Lists of stadiums by Asian country

List of stadiums in Afghanistan
List of football stadiums in Armenia
List of football stadiums in Azerbaijan
List of football stadiums in Bahrain
List of stadiums in Bangladesh
List of football stadiums in Bhutan
List of football stadiums in China
List of indoor arenas in China
List of stadiums in China
List of football stadiums in Cyprus
List of football stadiums in Georgia
List of stadiums in Hong Kong
List of football stadiums in India
List of indoor arenas in India
List of stadiums in India
List of stadiums in Indonesia
List of football stadiums in Iran
List of football stadiums in Iraq
List of football stadiums in Israel
List of indoor arenas in Israel
List of football stadiums in Japan
List of indoor arenas in Japan
List of stadiums in Japan
List of football stadiums in Jordan
List of football stadiums in Kazakhstan
List of football stadiums in Kuwait
List of football stadiums in Laos
List of football stadiums in Malaysia
List of football stadiums in the Maldives
List of football stadiums in North Korea
List of football stadiums in Oman
List of stadiums in Pakistan
List of football stadiums in Palestine
List of football stadiums in the Philippines
List of indoor arenas in the Philippines
List of football stadiums in Qatar
List of football stadiums in Saudi Arabia
List of baseball stadiums in South Korea
List of football stadiums in South Korea
List of indoor arenas in South Korea
List of international cricket grounds in Sri Lanka
List of football stadiums in Syria
List of stadiums in Taiwan
List of football stadiums in Tajikistan
List of football stadiums in Thailand
List of football stadiums in Turkey
List of indoor arenas in Turkey
List of football stadiums in Turkmenistan
List of football stadiums in Uzbekistan
List of football stadiums in Vietnam
List of football stadiums in Yemen

Other

List of stadiums in Asia
List of East Asia stadiums by capacity
List of Southeast Asia stadiums by capacity
List of attendance figures at domestic professional sports leagues
List of professional sports leagues by revenue

References

Stadiums by capacity
Asia
Stadiums by capacity